Hârseni is a commune in Brașov County, Transylvania, Romania. It is composed of five villages: Copăcel (Kopacsel), Hârseni, Măliniș (Malinis), Mărgineni (Marginen) and Sebeș (Sebes).

It is traversed south to north by the Sebeș River, a left tributary of the Olt River.

Natives
Vasile Suciu (1873–1935), Greek-Catholic  Metropolitan bishop of the Archdiocese of Făgăraș and Alba Iulia
 (1816–1897), military officer in the Imperial Austrian Army

References

Communes in Brașov County
Localities in Transylvania